This is a list of adult fiction books that topped The New York Times Fiction Best Seller list in 1936. When the list began in 1931 through 1941 it only reflected sales in the New York City area.

The two most popular books that year were Gone with the Wind, by Margaret Mitchell, which held on top of the list for 25 weeks, and The Last Puritan by George Santayana, which was on top of the list for 11 weeks.

See also

 1936 in literature
 Lists of The New York Times Fiction Best Sellers
 Publishers Weekly list of bestselling novels in the United States in the 1930s

References

1936
.
1936 in the United States